Benjaminia is a genus of parasitoid wasps belonging to the family Ichneumonidae.

The species of this genus are found in Northern America.

Species:
 Benjaminia aridens Kasparyan, 1976 
 Benjaminia carlsoni Wahl, 1989

References

Ichneumonidae
Ichneumonidae genera